Syed Serfraz Hussain Shah is a Pakistani politician who had been a Member of the Provincial Assembly of Sindh, from May 2013 to May 2018.

Early life and education

He was born on 17 April 1951 in Kandiaro.

He has a degree of Bachelor of Engineering in Civil.

Political career

He was elected to the Provincial Assembly of Sindh as a candidate of Pakistan Peoples Party (PPP) from Constituency PS-21 NAUSHERO FEROZE-III in 2013 Pakistani general election.

He was re-elected to Provincial Assembly of Sindh as a candidate of PPP from Constituency PS-33 (Naushahro Feroze-I) in 2018 Pakistani general election.

References

Living people
Sindh MPAs 2013–2018
1951 births
Pakistan People's Party MPAs (Sindh)
Sindh MPAs 2018–2023
People from Naushahro Feroze District